= PIATS =

Barcoding system

PIATS (Product Identification, Authentication and Tracking System) is a barcoding system, mainly used in China.

== PIATS barcode printing requirements ==
- A unique variable barcode printed or applied onto each primary/secondary package.
- Barcode type: UCC/EAN 128 (Multi) of 20 numbers, AI (Application Identifier)=21
- Density: >=7 mils, 10 mils is recommended.
- Code length=28 mm under 7 mils
- Code length=42.5 mm under 10 mils
- Bar height: >=8 mm
- Grade: >C (1.5)
- Quiet zone: >=1.5 mm for each zone

PIATS barcode example

Note:

- The AI value is not shown in the human readable data.
- The human readable number is split into 4 groups as above to make it easier for human reading.

== Types of commodities listed in PIATS legislation ==
- Household appliances
- Floor
- Cable and wire
- Fertilizer
- Gas oven
- Personal protective equipment
- Electric heating under blanket
- Food (including beverage, dairy)
- Cosmetics

Each category includes more than one sub-category, totally 69 types of commodities.

== Where to print or apply PIATS barcode ==
- Compulsory on primary packaging of the above 9 categories, or can be compromised onto secondary packaging if technology is limited. The latter is applicable only to dairy, beverage and cosmetics sectors at the moment.
- Compulsory on secondary packaging without compromise
- Option on tertiary packaging if commodity producer is willing to print or apply.

== How to code PIATS barcode onto packaging ==
- Directly printing barcode on packaging in line with production facilities
- Pre-print PIATS label and then apply it on packaging
